Phyllonorycter genistella is a moth of the family Gracillariidae. It is known from the Iberian Peninsula.

The larvae feed on Genista florida. They mine the leaves of their host plant. They create an upper-surface tentiform mine.

References

genistella
Moths of Europe
Moths described in 1900